Ralf Leberer (born 26 October 1973) is a German hurdler. He competed in the men's 110 metres hurdles at the 2000 Summer Olympics.

References

External links
 

1973 births
Living people
Athletes (track and field) at the 2000 Summer Olympics
German male hurdlers
Olympic athletes of Germany
People from Bodenseekreis
Sportspeople from Tübingen (region)